Denise Gyngell (born 30 August 1961) is a Welsh singer, actress and model. She is most famous as a member of the early 80s pop group, Tight Fit. She later married record producer Pete Waterman.

Biography
Denise Gyngell was born in Porth, Rhondda, South Wales. She went to the Barbara Speake Stage School and the Italia Conti Academy.

As a child, she was friends with Jay Aston of Bucks Fizz.

Career
She appeared in The Darwin Adventure (1972), with her brothers Paul and Michael, where they were all cast as Darwin's children.  In 1973 she appeared in the Play for Today episode "Song for Twilight", written by Noël Coward, featuring Peter Sallis. Along with Paul, she also appeared in The Zoo Robbery.

As part of pop group Tight Fit she had a No. 1 single with a cover version of "The Lion Sleeps Tonight", and a top 5 hit with "Fantasy Island" in 1982. The band re-formed in 2010 and began doing small gigs around Britain.

Gyngell was one of Hill's Angels on The Benny Hill Show during the early 1980s. She appeared in an episode of Ronnie Corbett's Sorry! in 1987.  She also made appearances with Kenny Everett and Morecambe and Wise.

She was also in several stage shows, including Aladdin, in pantomime.

Personal life
Gyngell married producer Pete Waterman in 1991; the couple divorced in 1999. They have two children.

References

External links
 
 Denise Gyngell with Tight Fit
 Denise Gyngell family tree

1961 births
Living people
People from Porth
Alumni of the Italia Conti Academy of Theatre Arts
20th-century Welsh women singers
Welsh television actresses